Poverty Resolutions is a 501(c)(3) nonprofit organization founded in February, 2010 in State College, Pennsylvania, by Matthew Jones and Andrew Jones. The mission is to educate America's youth on poverty in the developing world and inspire them to take action. Work in Haiti is focused on the long term economic improvement by providing sustainable solutions to poverty.

Background
Joining the floods of people to Haiti after the earthquake in 2010 were Matthew and Andrew Jones. They, however, were not going down to help out but to learn what real poverty was like. Matt and Andrew, along with two other friends, went down to Haiti to live in a tent city on $1 a day for food. On the objective of the trip Matthew Jones said,

We decided consciously that we didn't know enough about Haiti, and in order to do long-term development, we needed to ask what the people of Haiti really needed. We decided to go to Haiti first as learners, to say, "I'm sorry we don't understand Haiti. Can you show us and teach us?"

The documentary on their trip is called One-Dollar-Poverty. It was released on YouTube on August 14, 2012, and has amassed 100,000+ views in the first several months.

The decision to become focused on long term economic development stems directly from their journey to Haiti. They saw that handouts can do as much harm as good. Poverty Resolutions work in Haiti is guided by questions such as, What will make Haiti better years down the road?

Haitian Projects
Poverty Resolutions website states that the goal of Haitian projects is to "provide sustainable solutions to poverty, which empower individuals and organizations to meet the needs of their communities. " 

Projects in Haiti are designed to provide jobs and long term economic benefit. An example of this is a Tilapia Farm. Tilapia farms are big initial investments ($10,000), but provide jobs for farmers, Haitian builders, and fish sellers. In addition it is bringing a healthy food source into the economy.

Poverty Resolutions makes trips to Haiti and brings along a wide range of people from college athletes to blue collar professionals.

US Programs
Poverty resolutions is dedicated to educating youth, hoping to inspire the upcoming generation to take part in the global fight against poverty. One strategy has been to tap into the power of social media, one of the biggest traits of the upcoming generation.

Poverty Resolutions has found creative ways to get their message out. To demonstrate the enormity of 21,000, the number of children who die each day from poverty, 5 guys were shot with 21,000 paint-balls. 

Poverty resolutions also has presented assembly's for local schools. One school in particular, Gayman elementary, got behind the Poverty resolutions movement and fundraised $5,200, $3000 over their original goal.

References

Sources
 "Huffington Post" 2 February 2012 http://www.huffingtonpost.com/2012/02/29/rebuilding-haiti-poverty-resolutions_n_1308464.html
 "DTOWN Mag" 13 September 2011 https://archive.today/20111005030638/http://www.dtownmag.com/down-but-not-out-helping-haiti-rebuild-from-the-bottom-up
 "Penn State Live" 25 December 2011 http://live.psu.edu/story/56929|publisher=Penn State Live
 "PR Web" 13 June 2012 http://www.prweb.com/releases/2012/6/prweb9602218.htm
 "Phillyburbs.com" 3 July 2013 https://archive.today/20130703193402/http://www.phillyburbs.com/news/local/the_intelligencer_news/gayman-elementary-school-raises-money-for-haiti/article_a8cd461b-9903-5b71-89a6-55da61e78b0f.html
 "Syracuse University Athletics" 3 July 2013 http://www.suathletics.com/news/2013/6/12/FB_0612134919.aspx
 "Centre Daily Times" 3 July 2013 http://www.centredaily.com/2013/03/05/3523048/charitys-bus-has-plenty-of-stops.html

External links
 Official website

Charities based in Pennsylvania
Foreign charities operating in Haiti